The white-throated rail (Dryolimnas cuvieri) or Cuvier's rail, is a species of bird in the family Rallidae.

Distribution
It is found in the Comoros, Madagascar, Mayotte, and Seychelles.

Taxonomy
The nominate subspecies is found on Madagascar. A flightless subspecies (sometimes considered a distinct species), Dryolimnas (cuvieri) aldabranus (Aldabra rail), inhabits Aldabra, while the semi-flightless subspecies D. c. abbotti (Assumption rail) from Assumption Island went extinct in the early 20th century due to introduced predators. A fourth extinct flightless subspecies or descendant species is known from fossil remains on Aldabra, and anatomically was almost identical to the Aldabra rail. This subspecies was wiped out by rising sea levels during the Pleistocene,  but the atoll was recolonized by the white-throated rail after it resurfaced; this population evolved in a very similar way to the extinct subspecies, eventually evolving into the modern Aldabra rail. This is one of the very few observed instances of iterative evolution, in which a distinct population is wiped out from an area but it is recolonized by members of the source population, who evolve in the same way as the extinct population.

It is now the last living member of the genus Dryolimnas, and the Aldabra subspecies is believed to be the last flightless bird in the Indian Ocean. Its natural habitats are subtropical or tropical moist lowland forest and subtropical or tropical mangrove forest.

References

External links
Images at ADW

white-throated rail
Birds of the Comoros
Birds of Madagascar
Birds of Mayotte
Birds of Seychelles
white-throated rail
Taxonomy articles created by Polbot